Hoko is the tribal war dance of Easter Island, a dance of welcome and a sign of hospitality. It is also used before sports matches in the same way that the Haka is performed by the New Zealand national rugby union team, similar to those in Samoa, Tonga and Fiji.

Hoko in sport 
Presently, the Hoko is used before football and rugby union games by CF Rapa Nui of Easter Island.

References 

Easter Island
Wikipedia requested photographs of dance
War dances
Sports culture
Dances of Polynesia